Andrew Weber (born August 9, 1983) is an American soccer player who currently plays for Sporting Arizona FC.

Career

Youth and College
Weber played college soccer at the University of New Mexico where he holds UNM's career records for games played (83), minutes played (7,681), goalie wins (50), saves (350), and shutouts (25).  He also played with the Cape Cod Crusaders and the Indiana Invaders in the USL Premier Development League, and was part of the squad which won the 2003 PDL title.

Professional
Weber began his professional career with D.C. United, signing as a developmental player on June 3, 2005, after impressing during a one-week trial. Although he did not play a game in Major League Soccer, he did take part in three match-ups with United's reserve team. Weber joined Montreal Impact in the USL First Division in April 2006, and went on to make 29 appearances for the Québécois team over the next two years. During the 2007 season he was loaned to the Impact's farm team Trois-Rivières Attak of the Canadian Soccer League. He made his debut for the Attak on June 3, 2007 in a match against the Portuguese Supra, which resulted in a 4–2 victory.

Weber signed with San Jose Earthquakes on February 11, 2009  and made his league debut on September 27, 2009 in a 2–1 win vs D.C. United. He was released by the team on June 29, 2010, but re-signed with San Jose on March 7, 2011. At season's end, the club declined his 2012 contract option and he entered the 2011 MLS Re-Entry Draft. Weber was not selected in the draft and became a free agent.

He signed with Seattle Sounders FC for the 2012 season. At season's end, Seattle declined his 2013 contract option and Weber entered the 2012 MLS Re-Entry Draft. Weber was not selected in the draft and became a free agent. He joined Phoenix FC in USL Pro for the 2013 season and later re-joined the Sounders on a loan; he returned to Phoenix following the loan (having made three starts in Seattle).

He joined the Portland Timbers ahead of the 2014 season.

Personal life
Weber and his twin brother Elliot were contestants on the 20th season of The Amazing Race. They finished in 9th place out of 11 teams and were eliminated in Asunción, Paraguay.

Honors

Club
Cape Cod Crusaders
USL Premier Development League Champions (1): 2003
Portland Timbers
MLS Cup: 2015
Western Conference (playoffs): 2015

References

External links

 Andrew Weber Interview

1983 births
Living people
The Amazing Race (American TV series) contestants
American soccer players
Association football goalkeepers
Canadian Soccer League (1998–present) players
Cape Cod Crusaders players
D.C. United players
Expatriate soccer players in Canada
FC Arizona players
Indiana Invaders players
Major League Soccer players
Montreal Impact (1992–2011) players
National Premier Soccer League players
New Mexico Lobos men's soccer players
San Jose Earthquakes players
Seattle Sounders FC players
Soccer players from Phoenix, Arizona
Soccer players from Austin, Texas
Trois-Rivières Attak players
American twins
Twin sportspeople
USL Championship players
USL First Division players
USL League Two players
United Premier Soccer League players